Our Lady of Grace is a Roman Catholic church in Stratford, Connecticut, and part of the  Diocese of Bridgeport.

History 
This parish was created in 1954 in an area previously covered by St. James parish. The red brick Italian Romesque Revival building was designed by the highly regarded local church architect  Andrew G. Patrick.

References

External links 
 Our Lady of Grace - Website
 Diocese of Bridgeport

Roman Catholic churches in Connecticut
Our Lady of Grace Church (Stratford, Connecticut)
Buildings and structures in Stratford, Connecticut
Churches in Fairfield County, Connecticut